Malakhovo is a rural locality (a selo) and the administrative center of Malakhovsky Selsoviet, Kosikhinsky District, Altai Krai, Russia. The population was 750 as of 2013. There are 16 streets.

Geography 
Malakhovo is located 33 km west of Kosikha (the district's administrative centre) by road. Voskhod is the nearest rural locality.

References 

Rural localities in Kosikhinsky District